Conus recurvus, common name the recurved cone, is a species of sea snail, a marine gastropod mollusk in the family Conidae, the cone snails, cone shells or cones.

These snails are predatory and venomous. They are capable of "stinging" humans.

The variety Conus recurvus var. helenae Schwengel, 1955 is a synonym of Conus scalaris Valenciennes, 1832

Description
The size of the shell varies between 40 mm and 100 mm.

Distribution
This marine species occurs in the Pacific Ocean off Baja California, Mexico to Peru; off the Galapagos Islands.

References

 Schwengel, J. S. 1955. Nautilus. 69 (1): 15, plate 2, figure 12-13
 Tenorio M.J., Tucker J.K. & Chaney H.W. (2012) The families Conilithidae and Conidae. The cones of the Eastern Pacific. In: G.T. Poppe & K. Groh (eds), A conchological iconography. Hackenheim: Conchbooks.
 Puillandre N., Duda T.F., Meyer C., Olivera B.M. & Bouchet P. (2015). One, four or 100 genera? A new classification of the cone snails. Journal of Molluscan Studies. 81: 1-23

External links

 To World Register of Marine Species
 Cone Shells - Knights of the Sea
 Gastropods.com: Gradiconus regularis var. recurvus

recurvus
Gastropods described in 1833